Methylthiophene may refer to:

 2-Methylthiophene
 3-Methylthiophene